John Handley  may refer to:
 John Handley High School, public high school located in the city of Winchester, Virginia
 John Handley (judge), judge and philanthropist
 John Handley (MP) (1807–1869), Liberal Party politician in England, Member of Parliament 1857–1865